College GameDay (branded as ESPN College GameDay covered by State Farm for sponsorship reasons) is an ESPN program that covers college basketball and is a spin-off of the successful college football version. Since debuting on January 22, 2005, it airs on ESPN Saturdays in the conference play section of the college basketball season at 11 A.M. ET at a different game site each week. Before 2015, the college basketball version always appeared at the ESPN Saturday Primetime game location. Since the 2014–2015 season, the show has appeared at a top game of the week, similar to the college football version.  The program has also appeared at the site of the Final Four. The official name of the show is College GameDay Covered by State Farm.

In 2005, the host of the show the first four weeks was Rece Davis, but then the last four weeks Chris Fowler hosted the show. Since 2006, Davis has been the exclusive host of the show. Since the show debuted, Davis has been joined by Digger Phelps, Jalen Rose, Jay Bilas, Hubert Davis, Seth Greenberg, Jay Williams and LaPhonso Ellis as analysts. In 2008 during Championship Week, Bob Knight joined the cast, where he remained until 2012. Andy Katz has also served as a feature reporter giving up to the minute news and reports.

When College GameDay tipped off its 7th season on January 15, 2011, the show expanded to two hours, with the first hour airing on ESPNU, followed by the second hour on ESPN.  The first game of the 2011 schedule marked the first time the show has originated from a site that has featured a men's and women's game played in the same day.

Duke – North Carolina is the most featured matchup, appearing 18 times on College Gameday. The next closest is Florida – Kentucky with 8 appearances. Arizona – UCLA, Kansas – Kentucky and Kansas – Texas currently sit at 4.

History
The program has appeared in many different spots throughout each basketball arena. At Kansas, they were in the program's museum; at Kentucky, they were at the entrance of the arena; at UConn, they were on the concourse; at Gonzaga, Florida, and Marquette, they were on the court; and at Duke, they were in Krzyzewskiville, the tent village outside Cameron Indoor Stadium. It is also worth noting that in recent years (except for the Final Four), the morning airings of this program have taken place on the court.

Through the 2021–2022 basketball & football seasons, 39 schools (Arizona, Auburn, Baylor, Boston College, Clemson, Colorado, Florida, Florida State, Houston, Indiana, Iowa State, Kansas, Kansas State, Kentucky, Louisville, LSU, Memphis, Michigan, Michigan State, Missouri, North Carolina, North Carolina State, Notre Dame, Ohio State, Oklahoma, Oklahoma State, Oregon, Pittsburgh, Purdue, Tennessee, Texas, Texas A&M, Texas Tech, UCLA, Vanderbilt, Virginia Tech, Washington, West Virginia and Wisconsin) have hosted College GameDay for both basketball and football events.

Starting with the fourth season (2008), the basketball version of GameDay is broadcast in high-definition on ESPN HD.

On January 16, 2010, the 6th-season premiere of College GameDay, the show was broadcast live from the site of a women's college basketball game for the first time ever as it made an appearance at Gampel Pavilion in Storrs, Connecticut.  The show covered the women's college basketball game between Notre Dame Fighting Irish and the Connecticut Huskies.

On March 9, 2013, College GameDay had a men's doubleheader from 2 different sites (Washington, D.C., and Chapel Hill, North Carolina) for the first time in the show's history.  On January 18, 2014, College GameDay opened its tenth season with another men's doubleheader, this time, at The Palestra in Philadelphia, Pennsylvania, and at Gampel Pavilion in Storrs, Connecticut.

For the 2013 and 2014 seasons, the intro for College GameDay was Macklemore's 2013 hit, Can't Hold Us.

On April 7, 2014, longtime analyst Digger Phelps announced his retirement and would not return for the 2015 season. That summer, Jalen Rose announced he would not return due to his priorities with NBA Countdown. As a result of the two departures, ESPN announced that Seth Greenberg and Jay Williams would be analysts for 2015 and beyond.

On September 30, 2014, ESPN announced that College GameDay would no longer have a set schedule, just like the football version of the show. Instead, the location will be chosen the week before to give the network a better opportunity to pick games with ranked teams and interesting story lines.

On October 8, 2019, Jay Williams replaced Paul Pierce as an analyst on NBA Countdown, and left College Gameday. LaPhonso Ellis was announced as his replacement.

On January 10, 2023, ESPN announced it would be adding three women's college basketball shows in one season, equaling the total number of women's games they had done in the shows history, bringing the overall total for women's games to six.

Personalities

Current
 Rece Davis: (Host, 2005–present)
 Elle Duncan: (Women's Host, 2022–present)
 Jay Bilas: (Analyst, 2005–present)
 Seth Greenberg: (Analyst, 2015–present)
 LaPhonso Ellis: (Analyst, 2020–present)
 Rebecca Lobo: (Women's Analyst, 2022–present)
 Carolyn Peck: (Women's Analyst, 2022–present)
 Andraya Carter: (Women's Analyst, 2022–present)
 Holly Rowe: (Women's Reporter, 2022–present)

Former
 Chris Fowler: (Host, 2005)
 Hubert Davis: (Analyst, 2007–2012)
 Bob Knight: (Analyst, 2008–2012)
 Digger Phelps: (Analyst, 2005–2014)
 Jalen Rose: (Analyst, 2013–2014)
 Andy Katz: (Reporter, 2005–2017)
 Jay Williams: (Analyst, 2015–2019)

Locations

2005

2006

2007

2008

2009

2010

2011

2012

2013

2014

2015

2016

2017

2018

2019

2020

2021

2022

2023

Notes

Winners are listed in bold.
Home team listed in italics for neutral-site or off-campus games.
All rankings displayed for Division I teams are from the AP Poll.
Rankings displayed in parentheses refer to seeding in the NCAA Tournament.

Appearances by school
Announced and visited locations as of March 5, 2023. All schools are listed with their current athletic brand names and conference affiliations, which do not necessarily match those of a given school during its last GameDay appearance.

Frequent Matchups

College Gameday has attended several particular matchups with regularity.

AP Top 5 vs Top 5

See also
 Big Monday
 Super Tuesday
 Wednesday Night Hoops
 Thursday Night Showcase
 Saturday Primetime
 List of games televised on ESPN Saturday Primetime
 Championship Week

References

External links
 College GameDay-Basketball at ESPN.tv
 Official Press Release on ESPN Media Zone for 2008 season
  Behind the scenes with GameDay at Marquette (OnMilwaukee.com)

2010s American television series
2020s American television series
2005 American television series debuts
American sports television series
College basketball on television in the United States
ESPN College Basketball
ESPN original programming